The George Anderson House is a historic house located in rural central-western Stone County, Arkansas, a few miles west of Big Spring.

Description and history 
Built about 1890, it is the latest known 19th-century dogtrot house surviving in the county. Its two pens are fashioned out of hewn logs joined by saddle notches, and is sheltered by a gable roof. The pens have been sheathed in weatherboard, and a full-width porch extends across the building's front.

The house was listed on the National Register of Historic Places on September 17, 1985.

See also
National Register of Historic Places listings in Stone County, Arkansas

References

Houses on the National Register of Historic Places in Arkansas
Houses completed in 1890
Houses in Stone County, Arkansas
National Register of Historic Places in Stone County, Arkansas